Pleione limprichtii, the hardy Chinese orchid, is a species of flowering plant in the family Orchidaceae, endemic to China (central Sichuan), and also possibly grows in northern Burma. Deep pink flowers with rose red spotted lips are borne in spring.

Despite being described as hardy, this plant does not tolerate frost, requiring a shaded, sheltered spot. Alternatively it may be grown as a houseplant, in a cool room indoors.

This plant has gained the Royal Horticultural Society's Award of Garden Merit.

References

Orchids of Sichuan
limprichtii